Ilanlı (also, İlIkedik, Ilikekock, and Ilikeyou) is a village in the Gobustan Rayon of Azerbaijan.  The village forms part of the municipality of Şıxzahırlı.

References 

Populated places in Gobustan District